The Sanctuary of Our Lady of Nazaré is an imposing Marian shrine that memorializes an ancient miracle that occurred under the intercession of the Virgin Mary. It is located on the hilltop called O Sítio, overlooking Nazaré, in Portugal, and was founded in the 14th century.

Legend 

According to the Legend of Nazaré the sheriff (alcaide) of Porto de Mós, Dom Fuas Roupinho, maybe a templar, was chasing on horseback a deer up a hilltop on a misty September morning in 1182 (later it was said that it was the devil, in the disguise of a deer). When the deer jumped over the edge of the hilltop into the void, his fiery horse was about to follow. Then the knight invoked the intervention of the Madonna, who made the horse turn away through a supernatural effort and saved the life of the knight. Subsequently, a chapel A Ermida da Memoria, was built very near this spot, over a grotto where stood a small statue of a Black Madonna, brought from Nazareth. Near the chapel one can see the imprint of the horseshoe in the rock.

Overview

Construction 
The church was founded in the 14th century on the occasion of the arrival of King Ferdinand on a pilgrimage to Our Lady of Nazaré. The King not only ordered to do works in the Ermida da Memoria, but also decided to construct a new and improved place of cult, since the Hermitage did not have capacity to receive higher number of devotees of the Lady.

There were done some royal modifications on the temple, as Dom João I ordered some wooden porches. Dom João II remodeled the temple plan with enlarging it and building a new main chapel. King Manuel I replaced the wooden porches with some that remain up to the present day. The Church underwent various reformulations, especially in the main chapel. In the reign of Philip II, the portico was renovated and a new staircase was built. At the request of the Administrative Board, King Afonso VI ordered to do some renovation in Sanctuary. Changes were made in the structure of the temple, as the arch of the main chapel was enlarged and a new transept was added. The work was finished in 1691 and a Latin cross, similar to the current one was set in the church.  In 1717 temple's front was renovated, and a new access to the belfry was constructed, which has two towers now. When the transept was built, the rector Father António Caria commissioned a Dutch company to add tile panels for the decoration of this new space. Before the end of 1708 Father Caria received the drawings and plans of the tiles for approval by the Administrative Board of the Royal House. In October 1709, the 6,568 tiles by Dutch ceramist Williem Van der Klöet, with biblical episodes of Joseph and David and two scenes from Jonah's story, arrived at Sitio.

Interior design 
The single nave in the shape of Latin cross is covered with a wooden painted ceiling. There is a painting on canvas at the entrance of the nave on the left, illustrating the legend of the appearance of Our Lady of Nazareth to D. Fuas Roupinho. The high altar is made of gold-toned altarpiece with marbled and Solomonic columns of the late 17th century. There is a small window on the Throne illustrating image of Nursing Madonna with the Child on her lap. The figures are crowned by diadems of 18th century, presented to the church by D. João VI. The sacred image is wrapped with a green cloak decorated with gold gifted to the Virgin  by D.João V. The figures are crowned by diadems of 18th century, presented to the church by D. João VI. The sacred image is wrapped with a green cloak decorated with gold gifted by King John V to the Virgin. The main chapel is separated from the body of the church with an arcade made from pau-santo and a few pillars decorated with mosaic Italian marble of 19th century. The corridors of the Sacristy were covered with blue and white tiles by the Portuguese master António de Oliveira Bernardes in 1714. One of the panels illustrates the "Assumption of the Virgin", with symbols of Marian iconography. The remaining tiles in the corridors of the Sacristy were decorated by the master Manuel Borges.

Semicircular steps lead to a Baroque portal under two square bell towers. The facade has gallery-like extensions. The profusely decorated gilded apse shows the small statue of Nossa Senhora da Nazaré in a lit niche above the main altar, flanked by twisted columns. Above the crossing of the single nave with the transept is a cupola and a lantern. They are all vaulted by a gilt coffer ceiling.

Religious festival 
On 8 September of each year a romaria (religious festival) draws many tourists and pilgrims with the processions, bullfights and folk dancing.

Gallery

See also 
 Memory Hermitage of Nazaré

References

The Rough Guide to Portugal - March 2005, 11th edition- 
Rentes de Carvalho J. - Portugal, um guia para amigos (in Dutch Translation Portugal; De Arbeiderspers, Amsterdam, 1989; 9th edition, 1999 -

External links 
Patrimonio Cultural

Churches in Leiria District
Buildings and structures in Nazaré, Portugal
Azulejos in buildings in Portugal
Roman Catholic shrines in Portugal